The Supreme Court of Seychelles is the highest trial court in Seychelles.

It was created in 1903 by Order in Council, when it consisted of one judge who was the Chief Justice of the Court. Appeal cases with final judgments of the court in civil matters were transferred to the Supreme Court of Mauritius.

When Seychelles became a Republic in 1976, a new Seychelles Court of Appeal was constituted which consisted of a President, two Justices of Appeal and the Judges of the Supreme Court as ex-officio members. Appeals to the court of Civil Appeal of Mauritius were abolished.

In 1993, under the new constitution, the judicial power of Seychelles is vested in the Supreme Court, a Court of Appeal, and such subordinate courts or tribunals that may be established by legislature. The Attorney-General and the judges of the Supreme Court are appointed by the President from a list of candidates prepared by the Constitutional Appointments Authority. The head of the Supreme Court, who is also the head of the Judiciary, is entitled the Chief Justice. The other judges of the Supreme Court are referred to as Puisne Judges.

Chief Justices of the Crown Colony

Chief Justices of the Republic

References

Seychelles
Courts in Seychelles
1903 establishments in Africa